Amiga Survivor was a monthly computer magazine published by Crystal Software. The first issue was published in June/July 1998. This publication originally started as a black and white A5 size fanzine called The Domain but eventually became a full-colour A4 magazine. In 2000 the magazine was sold to CS&E. Robert Iveson served as the editor of the magazine. The magazine ceased publication in 2001.

References

External links 
 

1998 establishments in the United Kingdom
Amiga magazines
Monthly magazines published in the United Kingdom
Video game magazines published in the United Kingdom
Defunct computer magazines published in the United Kingdom
Magazines established in 1998
Magazines disestablished in 2001